Yellow Springs is a village in Greene County, Ohio, United States.  The population was 3,697 at the 2020 census. It is part of the Dayton Metropolitan Statistical Area. It is home to Antioch College.

History
The area of the village had long been visited and occupied by the Shawnee Native Americans well before European-American settlement.

In 1825, the village was founded by William Mills and approximately 100 families, followers of Robert Owen, who wanted to emulate the utopian community at New Harmony, Indiana.

The village was named after nearby natural springs with waters high in iron content.

The communitarian efforts dissolved due to internal conflicts.

The completion of the Little Miami Railroad in 1846 brought increased commerce, inhabitants, and tourism to this area of Greene County. Many regular visitors of the 19th century came for the springs, as these were believed to have medicinal benefits. The village of Yellow Springs was incorporated in 1856.

Antioch College 
Antioch College was founded in 1850 by the Christian Connection, and began operating in 1853 with the distinguished scholar Horace Mann as its first president.

In 1920, Arthur E. Morgan became president of Antioch College; he was known for his innovations and implemented a much-imitated work-study program for students. An engineer by training, Morgan left Antioch to become head of the Tennessee Valley Authority during President Franklin D. Roosevelt's administration. Upon his return to Yellow Springs, Morgan was a key leader of Quaker intentional community developments in Ohio and North Carolina.

In 1926, the Antioch Publishing Company was founded by two then-current Antioch College students as "The Antioch Bookplate Company". It expanded and began selling children's books, gifts, and craft products before selling the publishing company in 2008 to rebrand as Creative Memories and focus on gift items. The remaining Yellow Spring facility of Creative Memories closed in 2012.

Antioch College expanded beginning in 1964, to include 38 "centers" around the country by the end of 1979. Its by-laws were changed to define Antioch as a "network", not a college, owned by Antioch University Corporation. In 1986, 32 of its units around the country were closed, leaving six campuses, which included both its original College campus in Yellow Springs and the college's School of Adult and Experiential Learning there. It operated  separately as Antioch University McGregor. That adult and graduate education school was renamed as Antioch University Midwest in 1988.  It closed in late 2020.

In 2008, citing financial exigency, the university closed the college campus in Yellow Springs. College alumni, forming the Antioch College Continuation Corporation, bought back the college's name and campus. They reopened in 2011 as the independent Antioch College.

Now, Antioch University and Antioch College are wholly separate institutions.

Freed slaves 
The Conway Colony, a group of 30 freed slaves who were transported by Moncure D. Conway, the abolitionist son of their former owner, were settled in this village in 1862.

Wheeling Gaunt, a former slave who had purchased his own freedom, came to Yellow Springs in the 1860s. By his death in 1894, he owned a substantial amount of land.  Gaunt bequeathed to the village a large piece of land on its western side, requesting that the rent be used to buy flour for the "poor and worthy widows" of Yellow Springs.  Although the land was used to create Gaunt Park, and thus does not generate rent, the village expanded the bequest to include sugar. It still delivers flour and sugar to the village's widows at Christmas time, a tradition that generates annual media coverage.

Activism 
During the Red Scare of the 1950s, Yellow Springs and Antioch College came under scrutiny for alleged sympathies of faculty and students to the Communist Party, due to many locals' support of left-wing politics. After being questioned by the Ohio House Un-American Activities Committee, Antioch president Douglas McGregor released a statement in 1952 that "Antioch upholds the American tradition of academic freedom. This means the right to hear and investigate all sides of any question, including the question of Russia and Communism".

By the late 1960s and early 1970s, the village became a center of activity for the Civil Rights Movement and anti-war movement in southwestern Ohio. Villagers have retained a progressive cast in their politics, attracting new residents with similar ideas and establishing a unique sociopolitical demographic element in a primarily conservative region of the state.

In 1979, Yellow Springs held the distinction of being the smallest municipality to pass an ordinance prohibiting discrimination based on sexual orientation. As of 2014, it had the largest LGBT population of all Ohio's villages.

Geography
Yellow Springs is located at  (39.801723, −83.892662).

The village takes its name from a nearby natural spring whose waters are rich in iron, leaving a yellowish-orange coloring on the rocks. Now included within the nearby Glen Helen Nature Preserve, in the mid-19th century, it became the center of a resort. In this period, many individuals traveled to areas of such springs, believing the waters had medicinal benefits.

Demographics

2010 census
As of the census of 2010, there were 3,487 people, 1,672 households, and 902 families living in the village. The racial makeup of the village was 78.1% White, 12.0% African American, 0.6% Native American, 1.5% Asian, 0.4% from other races, and 7.3% from two or more races. Hispanic or Latino of any race were 2.0% of the population.

There were 1,672 households, of which 25.4% had children under the age of 18 living with them, 37.4% were married couples living together, 13.5% had a female householder with no husband present, 3.1% had a male householder with no wife present, and 46.1% were non-families. 39.2% of all households were made up of individuals, and 15.4% had someone living alone who was 65 years of age or older. The average household size was 2.04 and the average family size was 2.70.

The median age in the village was 48.5 years. 19.7% of residents were under the age of 18; 5.1% were between the ages of 18 and 24; 20.6% were from 25 to 44; 33.1% were from 45 to 64; and 21.6% were 65 years of age or older. The gender makeup of the village was 46.0% male and 54.0% female.

According to the US Census Bureau's 2006–2010 American Community Survey, the median income for a household in the village was $56,000 and the median income for a family was $71,379. Males had a median income of $52,208 versus $52,019 for females. The per capita income for the village was $32,886. About 6.7% of families and 15.1% of the population were below the poverty line, including 12.0% of those under age 18 and 10.1% of those age 65 or over.

Education
Yellow Springs Exempted Village School District (Yellow Springs Schools) operates three schools in the village: Mills Lawn Elementary, McKinney Middle School, and Yellow Springs High School.

The only private elementary school in Yellow Springs is the Antioch School, a democratic school for students in preschool through sixth grade. It was founded by Arthur Ernest Morgan as a laboratory school of Antioch College.

Antioch College was founded at Yellow Springs in 1850.

The city was also home to Antioch University Midwest ("AUM"), part of the Antioch University network.  By late 2020, AUM had been eliminated as a separate campus.  Its functions were absorbed into Antioch University's Online division, and its building put up for sale. However, Antioch University's administration, as well as its Online division and Graduate School of Leadership & Change, remained headquartered in Yellow Springs.

Yellow Springs has a public library, a branch of the Greene County Public Library.

Media
Yellow Springs is the home of public radio station WYSO, which is a member station of National Public Radio and was licensed to the Board of Trustees of Antioch College until WYSO became independently owned and operated in 2019. The station continues in collaboration with the college, such as by working with college students as interns.

Local news and events are covered by an independent weekly newspaper, the Yellow Springs News.

Arts and culture
Relative to its size, Yellow Springs has a large arts community. Local organizations include:
 Yellow Springs Arts Council
 Yellow Springs Theater Company
 Yellow Springs Kids Playhouse (now folded)
 Chamber Music Yellow Springs (CMYS)
 The World House Choir
 The Yellow Springs Community Chorus 
 The Yellow Springs Chamber Orchestra
 The Yellow Springs Community Band (YSCB)
 Yellow Springs Strings (Senior Orchestra)

Attractions

Glen Helen Nature Preserve
 Little Miami Scenic Trail
 John Bryan State Park

 Clifton Gorge State Nature Preserve
 Young's Jersey Dairy
 Various parks are owned by The Village of Yellow Springs and run through its Parks and Recreation department.  The Village's largest park is Gaunt Park, which has two baseball diamonds and a pool.  Just north of the Village is Ellis Park, which has a picnic area and a pond.   Several additional neighborhood park areas are scattered through the Village.

 Antioch Hall, North and South Halls
 South School
 Yellow Springs Historic District

Notable people

 Paul Abels, clergyman
 Noah Adams, public radio journalist and author
 Arnold Adoff, poet and author
 Cindy Blackman, jazz/rock drummer
 Alice Griffith Carr, Red Cross nurse in World War I
 Dave Chappelle, American comedian and actor
 Suzanne Clauser, screenwriter and novelist
 Mike DeWine, former US Senator, former Ohio Attorney General, current 70th Governor of Ohio
 Monica Drake, assistant managing editor, New York Times
 Jewel Freeman Graham, educator, social worker, attorney, and World YWCA president
 Richie Furay, singer, songwriter, and Rock & Roll Hall of Fame member
 Virginia Hamilton, children's author
 Anne Harris, musician and actor
 Jon Barlow Hudson, sculptor
 Mike Kahoe, Major League Baseball player
 Coretta Scott King, civil rights leader and wife of Martin Luther King Jr.
 John Lithgow, actor
 Neal Vernon Loving, racing pilot and aeronautical engineer
 Michael Malarkey, actor and musician
 David Nibert, sociologist, author and animal rights activist
 Catherine Roma, choral conductor
 David Wilcox, American folk musician

References

External links
 Village website
 Yellow Springs Chamber of Commerce
 

 
Villages in Greene County, Ohio
Villages in Ohio
Utopian communities in the United States
Populated places on the Underground Railroad
Populated places established in 1825
1825 establishments in Ohio